All for Free is a 2006 Bosnian-Croatian-Serbian film directed by Antonio Nuić.

The film premiered at the 2006 Pula Film Festival (the Croatian national film awards festival), where it went on to win the Big Golden Arena for Best Film award, along with the Best Director (Antonio Nuić), Best Screenplay (Antonio Nuić) and Best Supporting Actress (Nataša Janjić) awards.

References

External links

2006 films
2006 drama films
Bosnia and Herzegovina drama films
Croatian drama films
Bosnian-language films
Croatian-language films